Stefan Olsson was the defending champion but lost in the semifinals to Gordon Reid.

Alfie Hewett won the title, defeating Reid in the final, 6–2, 7–5.

Seeds

Draw

Finals

References

Singles Draw

Wheelchair Singles
Queen's Club Championships